Driving Force is a 1921 German silent film directed by Zoltán Nagy and starring Lya De Putti and Fern Andra. It premiered at the Marmorhaus in Berlin.

Cast

References

Bibliography

External links

1921 films
Films of the Weimar Republic

German silent feature films
German black-and-white films
Films based on works by Victorien Sardou